Khesht Masjed (also Romanized as Khashty-Mechet’) is a village in Pasikhan Rural District, in the Central District of Rasht County, Gilan Province, Iran. At the 2006 census, its population was 2,468, in 644 families.

References 

Populated places in Rasht County